Kaggeholms gård is a manor at Ekerö Municipality in Stockholm County, Sweden.

History
The site was first mentioned in a land title document in 1287. During the 1500s, the farm was owned by members of the Grip and Bååt families.

In 1647, Count Lars Kagg (1595–1661) acquired an estate on the island of Helgö situated in Lake Mälaren which he named Kaggeholm. In the 1720s, construction of the manor house began after drawings by Baroque architect Nicodemus Tessin the Younger (1654–1728). The chateau-style Kaggeholm Castle (Kaggeholms slott) received its present appearance in the middle of the 19th century when a number of major changes took place.

Today Kaggeholm is operated as a conference center managed by the Swedish property development company Sisyfosgruppen Holding. It had previously been used by the Swedish Pentecostal Movement as a training center for Kaggeholm College (Kaggeholms folkhögskola).

In popular culture 
The castle has been used as a private boarding school in Netflix's series Young Royals.

References

External links
Kaggeholms slott website
Kaggeholms folkhögskola website

Populated places in Ekerö Municipality
Uppland
Manor houses in Sweden